The 1946 Yale Bulldogs football team represented Yale University in the Ivy League during the 1946 college football season.  The Bulldogs were led by fifth-year head coach Howard Odell, played their home games at the Yale Bowl and finished the season with a 7–1–1 record.

Two Yale players received first-team honors from the Associated Press (AP) or International News Service (INS) on the 1946 All-Eastern football team: halfback Levi Jackson (AP-2, INS-1); and guard Fritz Barzilauskas (AP-1; INS-1). Jackson led Yale and ranked fifth nationally with 806 rushing yards and averaged 6.01 yards per carry.

Schedule

After the season

The 1947 NFL Draft was held on December 16, 1946. The following Bulldogs were selected.

References

Yale
Yale Bulldogs football seasons
Yale Bulldogs football